Zizik may refer to:
Zizik, Qabala, Azerbaijan
Zizik, Quba, Azerbaijan
Zizik, Republic of Dagestan, Russia